Italian Ambassadors are the official diplomatic representatives of the Government of Italy.

List of representatives

See also
List of diplomatic missions of Italy
List of ambassadors of Italy to the Ottoman Empire

References 

 
Italy